Robert Stanley Mistele (June 8, 1920 – September 22, 2011) was an American football coach. He served as the head football coach at Sterling College in Sterling, Kansas for two seasons, from 1962 to 1963, compiling a record of 3–14–1. Prior to coaching at Sterling, Mistele coached high school football for 13 years in the states of Michigan, Texas, and Oklahoma. He was also a founder and member of the Fellowship of Christian Athletes. Mistele died in 2011.

Head coaching record

References

External links
 

1920 births
2011 deaths
Sterling Warriors football coaches
High school football coaches in Michigan
High school football coaches in Oklahoma
High school football coaches in Texas
Sportspeople from Detroit